Meinrad Miltenberger (6 December 1924, Herdecke, Westphalia – 10 September 1993, Herdecke) was a German sprint canoer who competed in the 1950s. Competing in two Summer Olympics, he won a gold medal in the K-2 1000 m event at Melbourne in 1956.

Miltenberger also won four medals at the ICF Canoe Sprint World Championships with two golds (K-1 4 x 500 m: 1958, K-2 500 m: 1954), a silver (K-1 500 m: 1954), and a bronze (K-2 500 m: 1958).

References

1924 births
1993 deaths
People from Herdecke
Sportspeople from Arnsberg (region)
Canoeists at the 1952 Summer Olympics
Canoeists at the 1956 Summer Olympics
German male canoeists
Olympic canoeists of Germany
Olympic canoeists of the United Team of Germany
Olympic gold medalists for the United Team of Germany
Olympic medalists in canoeing
ICF Canoe Sprint World Championships medalists in kayak
Medalists at the 1956 Summer Olympics